A military exercise named Exercise Eskimo was held in the winter of 1944–45, in Saskatchewan to test existing methods of winter warfare by Canadian Army and the United States Army Air Corps. The troops would arrive in Prince Albert, Saskatchewan by train and then move to their destinations which were often farther north. Montreal Lake was a target area for dropping supplies by B-17 Flying Fortress and the then secret B-29.

Colour motion picture footage of the exercise was released in the CBC miniseries "The War in Colour".

External links
https://web.archive.org/web/20060218070144/http://www.img.forces.gc.ca/commelec/Brhistory/chap5_e.htm
Saskatchewan War Experience Photographs and video of the arrival, parade, and departure of troops involved in Exercise Eskimo in Prince Albert, Saskatchewan.

Eskimo
Canadian military exercises
Military aviation exercises